Space debris usually burns up in the atmosphere, but larger debris objects can reach the ground intact. According to NASA, an average of one cataloged piece of debris has fallen back to Earth each day for the past 50 years. Despite their size, there has been no significant property damage from the debris. Burning up in the atmosphere may also contribute to atmospheric pollution. Numerous small cylindrical tanks from space objects have been found, designed to hold fuel or gasses. 

Notable examples of space debris falling to Earth and impacting human life include:

1960s-1990s 
 1969: five sailors on a Japanese ship were injured when space debris from what was believed to be a Soviet spacecraft struck the deck of their boat. 
 1978: the Soviet reconnaissance satellite Kosmos 954 reentered the atmosphere over northwest Canada and scattered radioactive debris over northern Canada, some landing in the Great Slave Lake.
 1979: portions of Skylab came down over Australia, and several pieces landed in the area around the Shire of Esperance, which fined NASA $400 for littering.
 1987: a 7-foot strip of metal from the Soviet Kosmos 1890 rocket landed between two homes in Lakeport, California, causing no damage. 
 1991: Salyut 7 underwent an uncontrolled reentry on 7 February over the city of Capitán Bermúdez in Argentina.
 1997: an Oklahoma woman, Lottie Williams, was hit, without injury in the shoulder by a  piece of blackened, woven metallic material confirmed as part of the propellant tank of a Delta II rocket which launched a U.S. Air Force satellite the year before.

From 2000 
 2001: a Star 48 Payload Assist Module (PAM-D) rocket upper stage re-entered the atmosphere after a "catastrophic orbital decay", crashing in the Saudi Arabian desert. It was identified as the upper-stage rocket for NAVSTAR 32, a GPS satellite launched in 1993.
 2002: 6-year-old boy Wu Jie became the first person to be injured by direct impact from space debris. He suffered a fractured toe and a swelling on his forehead after a block of aluminum, 80 centimeters by 50 centimeters and weighing 10 kilograms, from the outer shell of the Resource Second satellite struck him as he sat beneath a persimmon tree in the Shaanxi province of China.
 2003: Columbia disaster, large parts of the spacecraft reached the ground and entire equipment systems remained intact. More than 83,000 pieces, along with the remains of the six astronauts, were recovered in an area from three to ten miles around Hemphill in Sabine County, Texas. More pieces were found in a line from west Texas to east Louisiana, with the westernmost piece found in Littlefield, TX and the easternmost found southwest of Mora, Louisiana. Debris was found in Texas, Arkansas and Louisiana. In a rare case of property damage, a foot-long metal bracket smashed through the roof of a dentist office. NASA warned the public to avoid contact with the debris because of the possible presence of hazardous chemicals. 15 years after the failure, people were still sending in pieces with the most recent, as of February 2018, found in the spring of 2017.
 2007: airborne debris from a Russian spy satellite was seen by the pilot of a LAN Airlines Airbus A340 carrying 270 passengers whilst flying over the Pacific Ocean between Santiago and Auckland. The debris was reported within  of the aircraft.
 2016: on 2 November, upper stage of Vega flight VV01 launched on 13 February 2012 reentered over Indian state of Tamil Nadu. A composite overwrapped pressure vessel  survived reentry and was recovered.
 2020: The empty core stage of a Long March-5B rocket made an uncontrolled re-entry - the largest object to do so since the Soviet Union's 39-ton Salyut 7 space station in 1991 – over Africa and the Atlantic Ocean and a 12-meter-long pipe originating from the rocket crashed into the village of Mahounou in Côte d'Ivoire.
 2021:
 A Falcon 9 second stage made an uncontrolled re-entry over Washington state on March 25, producing a widely seen "light show". A composite-overwrapped pressure vessel survived the re-entry and landed on a farm field.
 In September 2021 a high-pressure helium bottle weighing 50 kg from the aft end of the Centaur upper stage of an Atlas V rocket (international designator 2019 -094A) was discovered in south-eastern Australia near the town of Yambuk, Victoria.
 2022: 
 On 2 April, pieces of reentered space debris impacted multiple locations in Indian state of Maharashtra, the event of reentry was witnessed by many. Recovered debris consisted of metallic ring almost 3 meter in diameter along at least six composite overwrapped pressure vessels with some bearing '3CCA301001 B' marking. The debris is likely from third stage of Long March 3B rocket with Y77 serial, launched in February 2021.
 A month later on 12 May another incidence of space debris reentry and impact was reported over Indian state of Gujarat, surviving debris consisted of metal fragments and at least three composite overwrapped pressure vessels. Allegedly the falling debris killed a livestock animal and injured another as one metal fragment struck a sheep pen. The debris is likely from third stage of Long March 3B rocket with Y86 serial, launched in September 2021. Indian space agency ISRO is investigating both incidents.
 On 9 July 2022, trunk of SpaceX Crew-1 Dragon spacecraft reentered and its debris landed on multiple locations like Albury, Wagga Wagga and Canberra in New South Wales, Australia. Australia notified United Nations Committee on the Peaceful Uses of Outer Space about three pieces of recovered debris under Rescue Agreement on 26 August 2022.
 On 31 July 2022, empty core stage of Long March-5B made an uncontrolled reentry over Indonesia and Malaysia. The reentry was witnessed by many and later pieces of booster that survived reentry were recovered from multiple locations in Indonesia and Malaysia.

References 

Space debris
Space hazards
Pollution
Technology hazards